Laketown Township may refer to:

 Laketown Township, Michigan
 Laketown Township, Carver County, Minnesota

See also 
 Laketon Township, Michigan

Township name disambiguation pages